Paragammaropsidae is a family of amphipods belonging to the order Amphipoda.

Genera:
 Paragammaropsis Ren, 1991
 Stebbingiella Marques-Junior & Senna, 2013

References

Amphipoda